Lists of Nobel laureates cover winners of Nobel Prizes for outstanding contributions for humanity in chemistry, literature, peace, physics, and physiology or medicine. The lists are organized by prize, by ethnicity, by origination and by nationality.

General
 List of Nobel laureates, the general list
 List of heads of government and state Nobel laureates

By prize
 List of Nobel laureates in Chemistry
 List of Nobel Memorial Prize laureates in Economics
 List of Nobel laureates in Literature
 List of Nobel Peace Prize laureates
 List of Nobel laureates in Physics
 List of Nobel laureates in Physiology or Medicine

By laureate identity
 List of female Nobel laureates
 List of black Nobel laureates
 List of Latin American Nobel laureates
 List of Christian Nobel laureates
 List of Jewish Nobel laureates
 List of Muslim Nobel laureates
 List of nonreligious Nobel laureates

By origin
 List of countries by Nobel laureates per capita
 List of Nobel laureates by country
 List of Asian Nobel laureates
 List of African Nobel laureates

By nationality
 List of Argentine Nobel laureates
 List of Australian Nobel laureates
 List of Belgian Nobel laureates
 List of Chinese Nobel laureates
 List of Danish Nobel laureates
 List of Hungarian Nobel laureates
 List of Indian Nobel laureates
 List of Israeli Nobel laureates
 List of Italian Nobel laureates
 List of Japanese Nobel laureates
 List of Pakistani Nobel laureates
 List of Polish Nobel laureates
 List of Russian Nobel laureates
 List of Spanish Nobel laureates
 List of Welsh Nobel laureates

See also 
 Clarivate Citation Laureates